In mathematics, the Bernoulli numbers  are a sequence of rational numbers which occur frequently in analysis. The Bernoulli numbers appear in (and can be defined by) the Taylor series expansions of the tangent and hyperbolic tangent functions, in Faulhaber's formula for the sum of m-th powers of the first n positive integers, in the Euler–Maclaurin formula, and in expressions for certain values of the Riemann zeta function.

The values of the first 20 Bernoulli numbers are given in the adjacent table. For every odd , . For every even ,  is negative if  is divisible by 4 and positive otherwise.

The Bernoulli numbers were discovered around the same time by the Swiss mathematician Jacob Bernoulli, after whom they are named, and independently by Japanese mathematician Seki Takakazu.  Seki's discovery was posthumously published in 1712 in his work Katsuyō Sanpō; Bernoulli's, also posthumously, in his Ars Conjectandi of 1713.  Ada Lovelace's note G on the Analytical Engine from 1842 describes an algorithm for generating Bernoulli numbers with Babbage's machine. As a result, the Bernoulli numbers have the distinction of being the subject of the first published complex computer program.

Notation
The superscript  used in this article distinguishes the two sign conventions for Bernoulli numbers. Only the  term is affected: 

In the formulas below, one can switch from one sign convention to the other with the relation , or for integer  = 2 or greater, simply ignore it.

This article does not follow that notation.

History

Early history 
The Bernoulli numbers are rooted in the early history of the computation of sums of integer powers, which have been of interest to mathematicians since antiquity.

Methods to calculate the sum of the first  positive integers, the sum of the squares and of the cubes of the first  positive integers were known, but there were no real 'formulas', only descriptions given entirely in words. Among the great mathematicians of antiquity to consider this problem were Pythagoras (c. 572–497 BCE, Greece), Archimedes (287–212 BCE, Italy), Aryabhata (b. 476, India), Abu Bakr al-Karaji (d. 1019, Persia) and Abu Ali al-Hasan ibn al-Hasan ibn al-Haytham (965–1039, Iraq).

During the late sixteenth and early seventeenth centuries mathematicians made significant progress.  In the West Thomas Harriot (1560–1621) of England, Johann Faulhaber (1580–1635) of Germany, Pierre de Fermat (1601–1665) and fellow French mathematician Blaise Pascal (1623–1662) all played important roles.

Thomas Harriot seems to have been the first to derive and write formulas for sums of powers using symbolic notation, but even he calculated only up to the sum of the fourth powers.  Johann Faulhaber gave formulas for sums of powers up to the 17th power in his 1631 Academia Algebrae, far higher than anyone before him, but he did not give a general formula.

The Swiss mathematician Jakob Bernoulli (1654–1705) was the first to realize the existence of a single sequence of constants  which provide a uniform formula for all sums of powers.

The joy Bernoulli experienced when he hit upon the pattern needed to compute quickly and easily the coefficients of his formula for the sum of the th powers for any positive integer  can be seen from his comment. He wrote:

"With the help of this table, it took me less than half of a quarter of an hour to find that the tenth powers of the first 1000 numbers being added together will yield the sum 91,409,924,241,424,243,424,241,924,242,500."

Bernoulli's result was published posthumously in Ars Conjectandi in 1713.  Seki Takakazu independently discovered the Bernoulli numbers and his result was published a year earlier, also posthumously, in 1712. However, Seki did not present his method as a formula based on a sequence of constants.

Bernoulli's formula for sums of powers is the most useful and generalizable formulation to date. The coefficients in Bernoulli's formula are now called Bernoulli numbers, following a suggestion of Abraham de Moivre.

Bernoulli's formula is sometimes called Faulhaber's formula after Johann Faulhaber who found remarkable ways to calculate sum of powers but never stated Bernoulli's formula. According to Knuth a rigorous proof of Faulhaber's formula was first published by Carl Jacobi in 1834. Knuth's in-depth study of Faulhaber's formula concludes (the nonstandard notation on the LHS is explained further on):

"Faulhaber never discovered the Bernoulli numbers; i.e., he never realized that a single sequence of constants  ... would provide a uniform

for all sums of powers.

In the above Knuth meant ; instead using  the formula avoids subtraction:

Reconstruction of "Summae Potestatum" 

The Bernoulli numbers (n)/(n) were introduced by Jakob Bernoulli in the book Ars Conjectandi published posthumously in 1713 page 97. The main formula can be seen in the second half of the corresponding facsimile. The expression  means  – the small dots are used as grouping symbols. Using today's terminology these expressions are falling factorial powers . The integral symbol on the left hand side goes back to Gottfried Wilhelm Leibniz in 1675 who used it as a long letter  for "summa" (sum). Putting things together, for positive , today a mathematician is likely to write Bernoulli's formula as:

 

This formula suggests setting  when switching from the so-called 'archaic' enumeration which uses only the even indices 2, 4, 6... to the modern form (more on different conventions in the next paragraph). Most striking in this context is the fact that the falling factorial  has for  the value . Thus Bernoulli's formula can be written
 

if , recapturing the value Bernoulli gave to the coefficient at that position.

Definitions 
Many characterizations of the Bernoulli numbers have been found in the last 300 years, and each could be used to introduce these numbers.  Here only three of the most useful ones are mentioned:

 a recursive equation,
 an explicit formula,
 a generating function.

For the proof of the equivalence of the three approaches.

Recursive definition 
The Bernoulli numbers obey the sum formulas
 
where  and  denotes the Kronecker delta. Solving for  gives the recursive formulas

Explicit definition 
In 1893 Louis Saalschütz listed  a total of 38 explicit formulas for the Bernoulli numbers, usually giving some reference in the older literature. One of them is (for ):

Generating function 
The exponential generating functions are

The (ordinary) generating function
 

is an asymptotic series. It contains the trigamma function .

Bernoulli numbers and the Riemann zeta function 

The Bernoulli numbers can be expressed in terms of the Riemann zeta function:

           for  .

Here the argument of the zeta function is 0 or negative.

By means of the zeta functional equation and the gamma reflection formula the following relation can be obtained:

 for  .

Now the argument of the zeta function is positive.

  for  .

Efficient computation of Bernoulli numbers 

It is not feasible to carry out such a computation using the above recursive formulae, since at least (a constant multiple of)  arithmetic operations would be required. Fortunately, faster methods have been developed which require only  operations (see big  notation).

David Harvey describes an algorithm for computing Bernoulli numbers by computing  modulo  for many small primes , and then reconstructing  via the Chinese remainder theorem. Harvey's implementation has been included in SageMath since version 3.1.

{| class=wikitable style="text-align:right"
! Computer !! Year !! n !! Digits*
|-
|align=left| J. Bernoulli || ~1689 || 10 || 1
|-
|align=left| L. Euler || 1748 || 30 || 8
|- 
|align=left| J. C. Adams || 1878 || 62 || 36
|- 
|align=left| D. E. Knuth, T. J. Buckholtz || 1967 ||  || 
|- 
|align=left| G. Fee, S. Plouffe || 1996 ||  || 
|- 
|align=left| G. Fee, S. Plouffe || 1996 ||  || 
|- 
|align=left| B. C. Kellner || 2002 ||  || 
|- 
|align=left| O. Pavlyk || 2008 ||  || 
|- 
|align=left| D. Harvey || 2008 ||  || 
|}
* Digits is to be understood as the exponent of 10 when  is written as a real number in normalized scientific notation.

A possible algorithm for computing Bernoulli numbers in the Julia programming language is given by

b    = Array{Float64}(undef, n+1)
b[1] = 1
b[2] = -0.5
for m=2:n 
    for k=0:m
        for v=0:k
            b[m+1] += (-1)^v * binomial(k,v) * v^(m) / (k+1)
        end
    end
end
return b

Applications of the Bernoulli numbers

Asymptotic analysis 
Arguably the most important application of the Bernoulli numbers in mathematics is their use in the Euler–Maclaurin formula. Assuming that  is a sufficiently often differentiable function the Euler–Maclaurin formula can be written as

 

This formulation assumes the convention . Using the convention  the formula becomes

 

By the fundamental theorem of calculus,

 

Thus the last formula can be further simplified to the following succinct form of the Euler–Maclaurin formula

 

This form is for example the source for the important Euler–Maclaurin expansion of the zeta function

 

Here  denotes the rising factorial power.

Bernoulli numbers are also frequently used in other kinds of asymptotic expansions. The following example is the classical Poincaré-type asymptotic expansion of the digamma function .

Sum of powers 

Bernoulli numbers feature prominently in the closed form expression of the sum of the th powers of the first  positive integers. For  define

The coefficients of these polynomials are related to the Bernoulli numbers by Bernoulli's formula:
 
where  denotes the binomial coefficient.

For example, taking  to be 1 gives the triangular numbers  .

Taking  to be 2 gives the square pyramidal numbers  .

 

Some authors use the alternate convention for Bernoulli numbers and state Bernoulli's formula in this way:
 

Bernoulli's formula is sometimes called Faulhaber's formula after Johann Faulhaber who also found remarkable ways to calculate sums of powers.

Faulhaber's formula was generalized by V. Guo and J. Zeng to a -analog.

Taylor series
The Bernoulli numbers appear in the Taylor series expansion of many trigonometric functions and hyperbolic functions.

Tangent

 
Cotangent
 

Hyperbolic tangent

Hyperbolic cotangent

Laurent series
The Bernoulli numbers appear in the following Laurent series:

Digamma function:

Use in topology 
The Kervaire–Milnor formula for the order of the cyclic group of diffeomorphism classes of exotic -spheres which bound parallelizable manifolds involves Bernoulli numbers.

The Hirzebruch signature theorem for the  genus of a smooth oriented closed manifold of dimension 4n also involves Bernoulli numbers.

Connections with combinatorial numbers 
The connection of the Bernoulli number to various kinds of combinatorial numbers is based on the classical theory of finite differences and on the combinatorial interpretation of the Bernoulli numbers as an instance of a fundamental combinatorial principle, the inclusion–exclusion principle.

Connection with Worpitzky numbers 
The definition to proceed with was developed by Julius Worpitzky in 1883. Besides elementary arithmetic only the factorial function  and the power function  is employed. The signless Worpitzky numbers are defined as

 

They can also be expressed through the Stirling numbers of the second kind

 

A Bernoulli number is then introduced as an inclusion–exclusion sum of Worpitzky numbers weighted by the harmonic sequence 1, , , ...

 

This representation has .

Consider the sequence , . This can be seen via the table:

{| style="text-align:center"
|+ Identity ofWorpitzky's representation and Akiyama–Tanigawa transform
|-
|1|| || || || || ||0||1|| || || || ||0||0||1|| || || ||0||0||0||1|| || ||0||0||0||0||1|| 
|-
|1||−1|| || || || ||0||2||−2|| || || ||0||0||3||−3|| || ||0||0||0||4||−4|| || || || || || || 
|-
|1||−3||2|| || || ||0||4||−10||6|| || ||0||0||9||−21||12|| || || || || || || || || || || || || 
|-
|1||−7||12||−6|| || ||0||8||−38||54||−24|| || || || || || || || || || || || || || || || || || || 
|-
|1||−15||50||−60||24|| || || || || || || || || || || || || || || || || || || || || || || || || 
|-
|}

The first row represents .

Hence for the second fractional Euler numbers  / :

A second formula representing the Bernoulli numbers by the Worpitzky numbers is for 

 

The simplified second Worpitzky's representation of the second Bernoulli numbers is:

 / =  × /

which links the second Bernoulli numbers to the second fractional Euler numbers. The beginning is:

Connection with Stirling numbers of the second kind 

If  denotes Stirling numbers of the second kind then one has:

 
                                                              
where  denotes the falling factorial.

If one defines the Bernoulli polynomials  as:

Then after the following property of the binomial coefficient:

 
one has,

One also has the following for Bernoulli polynomials,

 

(resulting in ) which is an explicit formula for Bernoulli numbers and can be used to prove Von-Staudt Clausen theorem.

Connection with Stirling numbers of the first kind 
The two main formulas relating the unsigned Stirling numbers of the first kind  to the Bernoulli numbers (with ) are

 

and the inversion of this sum (for)

 

Here the number  are the rational Akiyama–Tanigawa numbers, the first few of which are displayed in the following table.

{| class="wikitable" style="text-align=center"
|+ Akiyama–Tanigawa number
! !!0!!1!!2!!3!!4
|-
! 0 
| 1 ||  ||  ||  || 
|-
! 1 
|  ||  ||  ||  || ...
|-
! 2 
|  ||  ||  || ... || ...
|-
! 3 
| 0 ||  || ... || ... || ...
|-
! 4 
| − || ... || ... || ... || ...
|}

The Akiyama–Tanigawa numbers satisfy a simple recurrence relation which can be exploited to iteratively compute the Bernoulli numbers. This leads to the algorithm shown in the section 'algorithmic description' above. See /.

An autosequence is a sequence which has its inverse binomial transform equal to the signed sequence. If the main diagonal is zeroes = , the autosequence is of the first kind. Example: , the Fibonacci numbers. If the main diagonal is the first upper diagonal multiplied by 2, it is of the second kind. Example: /, the second Bernoulli numbers (see ). Hence:

{| class="wikitable" style="text-align:center"
|+ Akiyama–Tanigawa transform for the second Euler numbers
|-
!  !! 0 !! 1 !! 2 !! 3 !! 4
|-
! 0
| 1 ||  ||  ||  || 
|-
! 1 
|  ||  ||  ||  || ...
|-
! 2 
| 0 ||  ||  || ... || ...
|-
! 3 
| − || − || ... || ... || ...
|-
! 4 
| 0 || ... || ... || ... || ...
|}

( = ) × (  = ) =  = .

Also valuable for  /  (see Connection with Worpitzky numbers).

Connection with Pascal's triangle
There are formulas connecting Pascal's triangle to Bernoulli numbers

where  is the determinant of a n-by-n Hessenberg matrix part of Pascal's triangle whose elements are: 

Example:

Connection with Eulerian numbers 
There are formulas connecting Eulerian numbers  to Bernoulli numbers:

A binary tree representation
S. C. Woon described an algorithm to compute  as a binary tree:

Woon's recursive algorithm (for ) starts by assigning to the root node .

For example:

Integral representation and continuation

The integral
 

Leonhard Euler (Opera Omnia, Ser. 1, Vol. 10, p. 351) considered these numbers and calculated

 

Another similar integral representation is

The relation to the Euler numbers and 

The Euler numbers are a sequence of integers intimately connected with the Bernoulli numbers. Comparing the
asymptotic expansions of the Bernoulli and the Euler numbers shows that the Euler numbers  are in magnitude approximately  times larger than the Bernoulli numbers . In consequence:

 

This asymptotic equation reveals that  lies in the common root of both the Bernoulli and the Euler numbers. In fact  could be computed from these rational approximations.

Bernoulli numbers can be expressed through the Euler numbers and vice versa. Since, for odd ,  (with the exception ), it suffices to consider the case when  is even.

These conversion formulas express a connection between the Bernoulli and the Euler numbers.

The magic of these numbers lies in the fact that they turn out to be rational numbers. This was first proved by Leonhard Euler in a landmark paper De summis serierum reciprocarum (On the sums of series of reciprocals) and has fascinated mathematicians ever since. The first few of these numbers are

  ( / )

The Bernoulli numbers and Euler numbers can be understood as special views of these numbers, selected from the sequence  and scaled for use in special applications.

 

The expression [ even] has the value 1 if  is even and 0 otherwise (Iverson bracket).

These identities show that the quotient of Bernoulli and Euler numbers at the beginning of this section is just the special case of  when  is even. Beginning with  the sequence starts ( / ):

 

These rational numbers also appear in the last paragraph of Euler's paper cited above.

Consider the Akiyama–Tanigawa transform for the sequence  / :

{| class="wikitable" style="text-align:right;"
! 0 
|1||||0||−||−||−||0
|-
! 1 
| || 1|| || 0|| −|| −||
|-
! 2 
| −|| || || || || ||
|-
! 3 
| −1|| −|| −|| || || ||
|-
! 4 
| || −|| −|| || || ||
|-
! 5 
| 8|| || || || || ||
|-
! 6 
| −|| || || || || ||
|}

From the second, the numerators of the first column are the denominators of Euler's formula. The first column is − × .

An algorithmic view: the Seidel triangle

The sequence Sn has another unexpected yet important property: The denominators of Sn divide the factorial . In other words: the numbers , sometimes called Euler zigzag numbers, are integers.

 . See.

Thus the above representations of the Bernoulli and Euler numbers can be rewritten in terms of this sequence as

What remains is to find a convenient way to compute the numbers . However, already in 1877 Philipp Ludwig von Seidel published an ingenious algorithm, which makes it simple to calculate .

Start by putting 1 in row 0 and let  denote the number of the row currently being filled
If  is odd, then put the number on the left end of the row  in the first position of the row , and fill the row from the left to the right, with every entry being the sum of the number to the left and the number to the upper
At the end of the row duplicate the last number.
If  is even, proceed similar in the other direction.

Seidel's algorithm is in fact much more general (see the exposition of Dominique Dumont ) and was rediscovered several times thereafter.

Similar to Seidel's approach D. E. Knuth and T. J. Buckholtz gave a recurrence equation for the numbers  and recommended this method for computing  and  'on electronic computers using only simple operations on integers'.

V. I. Arnold rediscovered Seidel's algorithm and later Millar, Sloane and Young popularized Seidel's algorithm under the name boustrophedon transform.

Triangular form:

{| style="text-align:right"
| || || || || || || 1|| || || || || || 
|-
| || || || || || 1|| || 1|| || || || || 
|-
| || || || || 2|| || 2|| || 1|| || || || 
|-
| || || || 2|| || 4|| || 5|| || 5|| || || 
|-
| || || 16|| || 16|| || 14|| || 10|| || 5|| || 
|-
| || 16|| || 32|| || 46|| || 56|| || 61|| || 61|| 
|-
|272|| ||272|| ||256|| ||224|| ||178|| ||122|| || 61
|}

Distribution with a supplementary 1 and one 0 in the following rows:

{| style="text-align:right"
| || || || || || || 1|| || || || || ||   
|-
| || || || || || 0|| || 1|| || || || || 
|-
| || || || || −1|| || −1|| ||  0|| || || || 
|-
| || || || 0|| || −1|| || −2|| || −2|| || || 
|-
| || ||  5|| ||  5|| ||  4|| ||  2|| ||  0|| || 
|-
| || 0|| || 5|| || 10|| || 14|| || 16|| || 16|| 
|-
|−61|| ||−61|| ||−56|| ||−46|| ||−32|| ||−16|| || 0
|}

Row sums: 1, 1, −2, −5, 16, 61.... See . See the array beginning with 1, 1, 0, −2, 0, 16, 0 below.

The Akiyama–Tanigawa algorithm applied to  / yields:

{| style="text-align:right"
| 1|| 1|| || 0|| −|| −|| −
|-
| 0|| 1|| || 1|| 0|| −
|-
| −1|| −1|| || 4|| 
|-
| 0|| −5|| −|| 1
|-
| 5|| 5|| −
|-
| 0|| 61
|-
| −61
|}

1. Its binomial transform leads to:

{| style="text-align:right"
|-
| 1|| 1|| 0|| −2|| 0|| 16|| 0
|-
|0||−1||−2||2||16||−16
|-
|−1||−1||4||14||−32
|-
|0||5||10||−46
|-
|5||5||−56
|-
|0||−61
|-
|−61
|}

The sum of the antidiagonals is 

2. Its binomial transform yields:

{| style="text-align:right"
|-
| 1|| 2|| 2|| −4|| −16|| 32|| 272
|-
|1||0||−6||−12||48||240
|-
|−1||−6||−6||60||192
|-
|−5||0||66||32
|-
|5||66||66
|-
|61||0
|-
|−61
|}

The absolute values of the second bisection are the double of the absolute values of the first bisection.

Consider the Akiyama-Tanigawa algorithm applied to  / ( = abs() + 1 = .

{| style="text-align:right"
|1||2||2||||1||||
|-
|−1||0||||2||||0
|-
|−1||−3||−||3||
|-
|2||−3||−||−13
|-
|5||21||−
|-
|−16||45
|-
|−61
|}

The first column whose the absolute values are  could be the numerator of a trigonometric function.

 is an autosequence of the first kind (the main diagonal is ). The corresponding array is:

{| style="text-align:right"
|0||−1||−1||2||5||−16||−61
|-
|−1||0||3||3||−21||−45
|-
|1||3||0||−24||−24
|-
|2||−3||−24||0
|-
|−5||−21||24
|-
|−16||45
|-
|−61
|}

The first two upper diagonals are  =  × . The sum of the antidiagonals is  = 2 × (n + 1).

− is an autosequence of the second kind, like for instance  / . Hence the array:

{| style="text-align:right"
|-
|2||1||−1||−2||5||16||−61
|-
|−1||−2||−1||7||11||−77
|-
|−1||1||8||4||−88
|-
|2||7||−4||−92
|-
|5||−11||−88
|-
|−16||−77
|-
|−61
|}

The main diagonal, here , is the double of the first upper one, here . The sum of the antidiagonals is  = 2 × (1).  −  = 2 × .

A combinatorial view: alternating permutations

Around 1880, three years after the publication of Seidel's algorithm, Désiré André proved a now classic result of combinatorial analysis. Looking at the first terms of the Taylor expansion of the trigonometric functions
 and  André made a startling discovery.

The coefficients are the Euler numbers of odd and even index, respectively. In consequence the ordinary expansion of  has as coefficients the rational numbers .

 

André then succeeded by means of a recurrence argument to show that the alternating permutations of odd size are enumerated by the Euler numbers of odd index (also called tangent numbers) and the alternating permutations of even size by the Euler numbers of even index (also called secant numbers).

Related sequences
The arithmetic mean of the first and the second Bernoulli numbers are the associate Bernoulli numbers: 
Via the second row of its inverse Akiyama–Tanigawa transform , they lead to Balmer series  / .

The Akiyama–Tanigawa algorithm applied to  /  leads to the Bernoulli numbers  / ,  / , or   without , named intrinsic Bernoulli numbers .

{| style="text-align:center; padding-left; padding-right: 2em;"
|-
|1||||||||
|-
|||||||||
|-
|0||||||||
|-
|−||−||−||−||0
|-
|0||−||−||−||−
|}

Hence another link between the intrinsic Bernoulli numbers and the Balmer series via .

 = 0, 2, 1, 6,... is a permutation of the non-negative numbers.

The terms of the first row are f(n) = . 2, f(n) is an autosequence of the second kind. 3/2, f(n) leads by its inverse binomial transform to 3/2 −1/2 1/3 −1/4 1/5 ... = 1/2 + log 2.

Consider g(n) = 1/2 - 1 / (n+2) = 0, 1/6, 1/4, 3/10, 1/3. The Akiyama-Tanagiwa transforms gives:

{| style="text-align:center; padding-left; padding-right:2em;"
|-
|0||||||||||||...
|-
|−||−||−||−||−||−||...
|-
|0||−||−||−||−||−||...
|-
|||||||||0||−||...
|}

0, g(n), is an autosequence of the second kind.

Euler  /  without the second term are the fractional intrinsic Euler numbers  The corresponding Akiyama transform is:

{| style="text-align:center; padding-left; padding-right: 2em;"
|-
|1||1||||||
|-
|0||||||||
|-
|−||−||0||||
|-
|0||−||−||−||−
|-
|||||−||−||−
|}

It is linked to the Oresme numbers. The numerators of the second line are  preceded by 0. The difference table is:

{| style="text-align:center; padding-left; padding-right: 2em;"
|-
|0||1||1||||||||
|-
|1||0||−||−||−||−||−
|-
|−1||−||0||||||||
|}

Arithmetical properties of the Bernoulli numbers

This intimately relates them to the values of the zeta function at negative integers. As such, they could be expected to have and do have deep arithmetical properties. For example, the Agoh–Giuga conjecture postulates that  is a prime number if and only if  is congruent to −1 modulo . Divisibility properties of the Bernoulli numbers are related to the ideal class groups of cyclotomic fields by a theorem of Kummer and its strengthening in the Herbrand-Ribet theorem, and to class numbers of real quadratic fields by Ankeny–Artin–Chowla.

The Kummer theorems 
The Bernoulli numbers are related to Fermat's Last Theorem (FLT) by Kummer's theorem, which says:

If the odd prime  does not divide any of the numerators of the Bernoulli numbers  then  has no solutions in nonzero integers.

Prime numbers with this property are called regular primes. Another classical result of Kummer are the following congruences.

Let  be an odd prime and  an even number such that  does not divide . Then for any non-negative integer 
 

A generalization of these congruences goes by the name of -adic continuity.

-adic continuity

Since , this can also be written

This tells us that the Riemann zeta function, with  taken out of the Euler product formula, is continuous in the -adic numbers on odd negative integers congruent modulo  to a particular , and so can be extended to a continuous function  for all -adic integers  the -adic zeta function.

Ramanujan's congruences 

The following relations, due to Ramanujan, provide a method for calculating Bernoulli numbers that is more efficient than the one given by their original recursive definition:

Von Staudt–Clausen theorem 

The von Staudt–Clausen theorem was given by Karl Georg Christian von Staudt and Thomas Clausen independently in 1840. The theorem states that for every ,
 
is an integer. The sum extends over all primes  for which  divides .

In particular, these denominators are square-free and divisible by 6.

Why do the odd Bernoulli numbers vanish? 
The sum

can be evaluated for negative values of the index . The von Staudt–Clausen theorem combined with Worpitzky's representation also gives a combinatorial answer to this question (valid for n > 1).

From the von Staudt–Clausen theorem it is known that for odd  the number  is an integer. This seems trivial if one knows beforehand that the integer in question is zero. However, by applying Worpitzky's representation one gets

 

as a sum of integers, which is not trivial. Here a combinatorial fact comes to surface which explains the vanishing of the Bernoulli numbers at odd index. Let  be the number of surjective maps from } to }, then . The last equation can only hold if

 

This equation can be proved by induction. The first two examples of this equation are

,
.

Thus the Bernoulli numbers vanish at odd index because some non-obvious combinatorial identities are embodied in the Bernoulli numbers.

A restatement of the Riemann hypothesis 
The connection between the Bernoulli numbers and the Riemann zeta function is strong enough to provide an alternate formulation of the Riemann hypothesis (RH) which uses only the Bernoulli numbers. In fact Marcel Riesz proved that the RH is equivalent to the following assertion:

Here  is the Riesz function

 

 denotes the rising factorial power in the notation of D. E. Knuth. The numbers  occur frequently in the study of the zeta function and are significant  because  is a -integer for primes  where  does not divide .  The  are called divided Bernoulli numbers.

Generalized Bernoulli numbers
The generalized Bernoulli numbers are certain algebraic numbers, defined similarly to the Bernoulli numbers, that are related to special values of Dirichlet -functions in the same way that Bernoulli numbers are related to special values of the Riemann zeta function.

Let  be a Dirichlet character modulo .

 

Apart from the exceptional , we have, for any Dirichlet character , that  if .

Generalizing the relation between Bernoulli numbers and values of the Riemann zeta function at non-positive integers, one has the for all integers :

 

Eisenstein–Kronecker number

Eisenstein–Kronecker numbers are an analogue of the generalized Bernoulli numbers for imaginary quadratic fields. They are related to critical L-values of Hecke characters.

Appendix

Assorted identities

See also 
 Bernoulli polynomial
 Bernoulli polynomials of the second kind
 Bell number
 Euler number
 Genocchi number
 Kummer's congruences
 Poly-Bernoulli number
 Hurwitz zeta function
 Euler summation
 Stirling polynomial
 Sums of powers

Notes

References 
 .
 
 .
 .
 .
 .
.
 .
 .
 
 
 .
 .
 
 .
.
.
.
.
 .
 .
 .
.
 .
 .

Footnotes

External links
 
 The first 498 Bernoulli Numbers from Project Gutenberg
 A multimodular algorithm for computing Bernoulli numbers
 The Bernoulli Number Page
 Bernoulli number programs at LiteratePrograms
 
 
 
 
 
 

Number theory
Topology
Integer sequences